Rikard Andersson is a retired Swedish footballer. Andersson made 17 Svenska Serien and Allsvenskan appearances for Djurgården and scored 0 goals.

References

Swedish footballers
Djurgårdens IF Fotboll players
Svenska Serien players
Allsvenskan players
Association footballers not categorized by position